Dmitriy Kaltenberger (sometimes listed as Dmitry Kaltenberger, born 18 April 1976) is a Kazakhstani sprint canoeist who competed in the late 2000s. At the 2008 Summer Olympics in Beijing, he was eliminated in the semifinals of the K-2 500 m event.

External links
Sports-Reference.com profile

1976 births
Canoeists at the 2008 Summer Olympics
Kazakhstani male canoeists
Living people
Olympic canoeists of Kazakhstan
Asian Games medalists in canoeing
Canoeists at the 2002 Asian Games
Canoeists at the 2006 Asian Games
Canoeists at the 1998 Asian Games
People from Turkistan Region
Asian Games gold medalists for Kazakhstan
Medalists at the 1998 Asian Games
Medalists at the 2002 Asian Games
Medalists at the 2006 Asian Games
21st-century Kazakhstani people